Hughes A.M.E. Chapel, also known as the Trinity Methodist Episcopal Church and the Nause-Waiwash Longhouse, is a historic building located near Cambridge in Dorchester County, Maryland, United States. It is a simple rectangular frame structure, three-bays in length, with a medium-pitched gable roof. The exterior is covered with weatherboard siding and the windows are covered with shutters. The former church building is a common example of late 19th and early 20th century religious buildings that were built in rural communities on the Eastern Shore of Maryland. It was located in the Bucktown area, which was home to  bi- and tri-racial people who were descended from Native, African, and European Americans. The building has been occupied throughout its existence including ancestors of the Nause-Waiwash Band of Indians, who acquired the building in 1998. It was listed on the National Register of Historic Places in 2018.

References

African-American history in Cambridge, Maryland
African Methodist Episcopal churches in Maryland
African–Native American relations
Churches completed in 1894
Churches in Dorchester County, Maryland
Churches on the National Register of Historic Places in Maryland
European American culture in Maryland
Former churches in Maryland
Former Methodist church buildings in the United States
Multiracial affairs in the United States
National Register of Historic Places in Dorchester County, Maryland
Native American history of Maryland